Soe Min Thu (born September 25, 1988) is a Burmese long-distance runner. He won a bronze medal for the men's 10,000 metres at the 2007 Southeast Asian Games in Bangkok, Thailand, setting his personal best time of 31:33.26.

Soe Min Thu represented Myanmar at the 2008 Summer Olympics in Beijing, where he competed for the men's 5,000 metres. He ran in the first heat against thirteen other athletes, including Kenya's Eliud Kipchoge, who later won the silver medal in the final. He finished the race in last place by one minute and thirty seconds behind Japan's Takayuki Matsumiya, with a time of 15:50.56. However, Soe Min Thu failed to advance into the final, as he placed thirty-ninth overall, and was ranked farther below four mandatory slots for the next round.

References

External links
 

NBC 2008 Olympics profile

Burmese male long-distance runners
Living people
Olympic athletes of Myanmar
Athletes (track and field) at the 2008 Summer Olympics
Southeast Asian Games medalists in athletics
1988 births
Southeast Asian Games bronze medalists for Myanmar
Competitors at the 2007 Southeast Asian Games